Baltimore was a potwalloper constituency represented in the Irish House of Commons from 1614 to 1801.

Borough
This constituency was a parliamentary borough based in the town of Baltimore in County Cork.

Potwalloper
A potwalloper (sometimes  or potwaller) is an archaic term referring to a borough constituency returning members to the British House of Commons before 1832 and the Reform Act created a uniform suffrage. Several potwalloper constituencies were also represented in the Irish House of Commons, prior to its abolition in 1801. A potwalloper borough was one in which a householder had the right to vote if he had, in his house, a hearth large enough to boil, or wallop, a cauldron, or pot. The electors for Baltimore were tenants at will of the Freke family.

History
In the Patriot Parliament of 1689 summoned by King James II, Baltimore was represented with two members.

Members of Parliament, 1613–1801

Baltimore, Incorporated 25 March 1613.

 1613–1615
 1613 Sir Thomas Crooke, 1st Baronet
 1613 Henry Piers
 1634–1635
 1634 Lott Peere, absent in England and replaced 1634 by James Travers
 1634 Edward Skipwith,
 1639–1641
 1639 Bryan Jones
 1639 Henry Knyveton
 1661–1666
 1661 Sir Nicholas Purdon
 1661 Richard Townsend

1689–1801

Notes

References

Bibliography

 Johnston-Liik, E. M. (2002). History of the Irish Parliament, 1692–1800, Publisher: Ulster Historical Foundation (28 February 2002), 
 T. W. Moody, F. X. Martin, F. J. Byrne, A New History of Ireland 1534-1691, Oxford University Press, 1978
 Tim Cadogan and Jeremiah Falvey, A Biographical Dictionary of Cork, 2006, Four Courts Press 

Constituencies of the Parliament of Ireland (pre-1801)
Historic constituencies in County Cork
1614 establishments in Ireland
1800 disestablishments in Ireland
Constituencies established in 1614
Constituencies disestablished in 1800